In computer science, a run of a sequence is a non-decreasing range of the sequence that cannot be extended.  The number of runs of a sequence is the number of increasing subsequences of the sequence. This is a measure of presortedness, and in particular measures how many subsequences must be merged to sort a sequence.

Definition
Let  be a sequence of elements from a totally ordered set. That is,  and  assuming that  and  exists.

It is equivalently defined as the number of runs of  minus one. This definition ensure that , that is, the  if, and only if, the sequence  is sorted.

Sorting sequences with a low number of runs
The function  is a measure of presortedness. The natural merge sort is -optimal.  That is, if it is known that a sequence has a low number of runs, it can be efficiently sorted using the natural merge sort.

Long runs 
A long run is defined similarly to a run, except that the sequence can be either non-decreasing or non-increasing. The number of long runs is not a measure of presortedness. A sequence with a small number of long runs can be sorted efficiently by first reversing the decreasing runs and then using a natural merge sort.

References

Sorting algorithms